Kieran P. Egan (26 May 1916 – 25 March 1976) was an Irish Fianna Fáil politician. He was elected to Dáil Éireann as a Fianna Fáil Teachta Dála (TD) for the Laois–Offaly constituency at the 1956 by-election caused by the death of William Davin of the Labour Party. He was re-elected at the 1957 and 1961 general elections. He lost his seat at the 1965 general election, but was subsequently elected to the 11th Seanad by the Administrative Panel. He did not contest the 1969 Seanad election.

References

1916 births
1976 deaths
Fianna Fáil TDs
Members of the 15th Dáil
Members of the 16th Dáil
Members of the 17th Dáil
Members of the 11th Seanad
Fianna Fáil senators